is a Japanese manga series written and illustrated by Miyuki Tonogaya. It began serialization on Square Enix's Gangan Pixiv manga website in July 2019. As of December 2022, the series' individual chapters have been collected into seven volumes. An anime television series adaptation by Zero-G and Liber premiered in January 2023.

Characters

{{voiced by|Ayane Sakura<ref name="anime3">

Media

Manga
Written and illustrated by Miyuki Tonogaya, the series initially began its release on Tonogaya's Twitter account on August 3, 2018. It began serialization on Square Enix's Gangan Pixiv manga website on July 12, 2019. As of December 2022, the series' individual chapters have been collected into seven tankōbon volumes.

In November 2021, Comikey announced that they licensed the series. In March 2023, Square Enix Manga & Books announced that they licensed the series for English publication.

Volume list

Anime
An anime television series adaptation, produced by Zero-G and Liber, was announced on June 21, 2022. It is directed by Mankyū, with scripts written by Tomoko Konparu, character designs handled by Miyako Kanō, and music composed by Ruka Kawada. The series premiered on January 4, 2023, on Tokyo MX and other networks. At Anime NYC 2022, Crunchyroll announced that they licensed the series. Medialink licensed the series in Southeast Asia and streamed on Ani-One Asia YouTube channel.

Episode list

Reception
In the 2019 Next Manga Award, the series ranked 12th in the web manga category.

Notes

References

External links
 

2023 anime television series debuts
Anime series based on manga
Crunchyroll anime
Fantasy anime and manga
Gangan Comics manga
Japanese webcomics
Josei manga
Medialink
Romantic comedy anime and manga
Tokyo MX original programming
Webcomics in print
Zero-G (studio)